

History
Morrinsville Rugby and Sports Club was formed in 1996, with the combination of two rival clubs Morrinsville United Old Boys and Morrinsville Marist (Formally St Joseph's Rugby Club). Sports have fielded teams in most grades, As, Bs, U21s, U19s since starting. It is by far the strongest club in Morrinsville and one of the strongest clubs in the Waikato.

The A team have made it through to the major semi finals four times in 1998 and 2007, 2009 & 2010.

In 2009 The A team Made the Final for the 1st time only 2 weeks after the shock death of their coach Darrin Stevenson. The Side went on to win the final against Fraser Tech 26 - 18.

In 2010 The A side returned to the final against Fraser Tech once again, unfortunately going down 15 -19.

The U21s were beaten finalists in 2005, and there has been numerous Lion Cup (pro/rele)victories included.

The club formed an Under 85 kg team for the first time in 2010, this team made it through to the final in their first year on the back of 12 straight wins-going down to Hamilton Marist in the final.

2010 was a great season for the entire club with the Premier As making the final, the Bs making the semis, the 21s making the semis, and the 85s making the final.

2011 saw the Under 85s winning the first major Waikato rugby final to be played on Morrinsvilles Campbell Park, beating Te Rapa in the final.
The Under 21s were beaten finalists in the same year.

2012 saw the Under 85s go back to back, winning another home final to take out the championship, while the Under 21s also won the Waikato championship-the first time the club has won this competition .

Representative Rugby
Rep players through the club include.

Waikato -

Duane Monkley - 95.

Chresten Davis - 99-03.

Tony Philps - 00-03.

Luke Ottley - 01.

Loki Crichton - 02-06.

Derek Maisey- 02.

Dwayne Sweeney - 02-10. & 17-18

Brendon Leonard - 06-10.

Alex Bradley - 08-10.

Sione Lauaki

Chiefs -

Duane Monkley - 96.

Chresten Davis - 99-04.

Loki Crichton - 02-04.

Tony Philps - 02-03.

Dwayne Sweeney - 07-13.

Brendon Leonard - 07-11.

Alex Bradley - 2012

Sione Lauaki

Internationals -
Waisake Masirewa - Fiji, Fiji Sevens, NZ Sevens
Dwayne Sweeney - NZ U21 (04), NZ Sevens (06), NZ Maori (07-08)
Asipeli Dauwai - NZ Sevens (06)
Brendon Leonard - All Blacks (07-09)
Vesi Raluni - Fiji (07)
Daniel Hainsworth - NZ Barbarians weight limit (NZ 85s) (11- )

2007 was the biggest year thus far for the club, with the naming of Vesi Rauluni (Fiji), Dwayne Sweeney (New Zealand Māori rugby union team), and Brendon Leonard (All Blacks) all in one week.

References

New Zealand rugby union teams
Sport in Waikato
Morrinsville